Marco Dawson (born November 17, 1963) is an American professional golfer who now plays on the PGA Tour Champions, having previously played on the PGA Tour. He won the 2015 Senior Open Championship.

Dawson was born on a United States military base in Freising, Germany. He attended Florida Southern College, graduating in 1985, when turned professional. Dawson has enjoyed a long career playing both the PGA and Web.com Tours. He played on the PGA Tour in 1991–1997, 2000–2001, 2003–2008 and 2012 and played on the Web.com Tour in 1990, 1999, 2002, 2009–11, and 2013.

Dawson has won once on the Web.com Tour, a three stroke victory at the 2002 LaSalle Bank Open. His best finish on the PGA Tour is 2nd at the 1995 Greater Milwaukee Open, when he finished three strokes behind Scott Hoch.

He secured a return to the PGA Tour for 2012 via qualifying school in December 2011.

Dawson lives in Suntree, Florida.

Playing partner disqualifications
In 2003, Dawson became involved in two separate incidents involving rules breaches. At the Chrysler Classic of Tucson in March, he was playing with Brandel Chamblee when Chamblee took an incorrect drop. Dawson was criticized for only notifying rules officials shortly after he had signed Chamblee's card, meaning disqualification rather than a two-stroke penalty. In a similar incident in October, Dawson was playing with Esteban Toledo when he called Toledo on an incorrect drop, resulting in Toledo's disqualification. The latter incident resulted in a feud in which Toledo sacked the agent both players shared, and Dawson was eventually fined $10,000 for not informing officials of an infringement promptly.

Professional wins (3)

Buy.com Tour wins (1)

Buy.com Tour playoff record (0–1)

Champions Tour wins (2)

Results in major championships

Note: Dawson never played in the Masters Tournament.

CUT = missed the half-way cut
"T" indicates a tie for a place

Senior major championships

Wins (1)

Results timeline
Results not in chronological order before 2022.

CUT = missed the halfway cut
"T" indicates a tie for a place
NT = No tournament due to COVID-19 pandemic

See also
1990 PGA Tour Qualifying School graduates
1991 PGA Tour Qualifying School graduates
1994 PGA Tour Qualifying School graduates
1999 Nike Tour graduates
2002 Buy.com Tour graduates
2005 PGA Tour Qualifying School graduates
2006 PGA Tour Qualifying School graduates
2011 PGA Tour Qualifying School graduates

References

External links

American male golfers
Florida Southern Moccasins men's golfers
PGA Tour golfers
PGA Tour Champions golfers
Winners of senior major golf championships
Korn Ferry Tour graduates
Golfers from Florida
People from Freising
Sportspeople from Upper Bavaria
Sportspeople from Lakeland, Florida
St. Thomas Aquinas High School (Florida) alumni
People from Merritt Island, Florida
1963 births
Living people